Marinobacterium litorale  is a Gram-negative, chemoheterotrophic and facultatively anaerobic bacterium from the genus of Marinobacterium which has been isolated from seawater the coast of Deokjeokdo.

References

 

Alteromonadales
Bacteria described in 2007